Badger Lake may refer to:

 Badger Lake (Alberta), a lake in Canada
 Badger Lake (Minnesota), a lake in Polk County, Minnesota

See also
 Badger Lakes, a pair of lakes in Murray County, Minnesota
 Lake Badger, a lake in South Dakota